Garret Andrew Kusch (born 26 September 1973) is a Canadian former soccer player who played at both professional and international levels as a striker. After retiring as a player, Kusch became a Chiropractor.

Club career
Born in Richmond, British Columbia, Kusch started his career at local side Vancouver 86ers and then played successfully in a Belgian lower division with Mons. Injury-hit, he then only featured twice for Mechelen in the Belgian First Division in the 1999/2000 season. He revived his career after a foot injury at Swedish second division side Mjällby only to finish the first of his two years-contract at Norwegian second division outfit Hønefoss to quit professional soccer aged just 28 in 2001 to continue his studies.

Kusch briefly came out of retirement in 2007 to play for Columbus Clan FC; earning a silver medal in the Open Canada Cup.

International career
Kusch made his debut for Canada in an April 1997 FIFA World Cup qualification match against El Salvador in Vancouver and earned a total of 21 caps, scoring 1 goal. The shaven-headed striker has represented Canada in 5 FIFA World Cup qualification matches and participated in the 2001 FIFA Confederations Cup, where he played his final international against Cameroon.

Personal life
Kusch currently works for the Canadian national team as a chiropractor.

References

External links
 (archive)

1973 births
Living people
People from Richmond, British Columbia
Canadian people of German descent
Association football forwards
Soccer people from British Columbia
Canadian soccer players
Canadian expatriate soccer players
Canada men's youth international soccer players
Canada men's under-23 international soccer players
Canada men's international soccer players
CONCACAF Gold Cup-winning players
2000 CONCACAF Gold Cup players
2001 FIFA Confederations Cup players
Canadian expatriate sportspeople in Belgium
Canadian expatriate sportspeople in Sweden
Canadian expatriate sportspeople in Norway
Vancouver Whitecaps (1986–2010) players
R.A.E.C. Mons players
K.V. Mechelen players
Hønefoss BK players
Mjällby AIF players
Vancouver Columbus players
A-League (1995–2004) players
Belgian Pro League players
Expatriate footballers in Belgium
Expatriate footballers in Sweden
Expatriate footballers in Norway
Association football physiotherapists